Australia and its offshore islands and territories have 898 recorded bird species as of 2014. Of the recorded birds, 165 are considered vagrant or accidental visitors, of the remainder over 45% are classified as Australian endemics: found nowhere else on earth. It has been suggested that up to 10% of Australian bird species may go extinct by the year 2100 as a result of climate change.

Australian species range from the tiny  weebill to the huge, flightless emu. Many species of Australian birds will immediately seem familiar to visitors from the Northern Hemisphere: Australian wrens look and act much like northern wrens, and Australian robins seem to be close relatives of the northern robins. However, the majority of Australian passerines are descended from the ancestors of the crow family, and the close resemblance is misleading: the cause is not genetic relatedness but convergent evolution.

For example, almost any land habitat offers a nice home for a small bird that specialises in finding small insects: the form best fitted to that task is one with long legs for agility and obstacle clearance, moderately-sized wings optimised for quick, short flights, and a large, upright tail for rapid changes of direction. In consequence, the unrelated birds that fill that role in the Americas and in Australia look and act as though they are close relatives.

Australian birds which show convergent evolution with Northern Hemisphere species:
 honeyeaters (resemble sunbirds)
 sittellas (resemble nuthatches)
 Australasian babblers (resemble scimitar babblers)
 Australian robins (resemble Old World chats)
 Scrub robins (resemble thrushes)

Kinds of birds
Australian birds can be classified into six categories:
 Old endemics: long-established non-passerines of ultimately Gondwanan origin, notably emus, cassowaries and the huge parrot group
 Corvid radiation: Passerines peculiar to Australasia, descended from the crow family, and now occupying a vast range of roles and sizes; examples include wrens, robins, magpies, thornbills, pardalotes, the huge honeyeater family, treecreepers, lyrebirds, birds-of-paradise and bowerbirds
 Eurasian colonists: later colonists from Eurasia, including plovers, swallows, larks, thrushes, cisticolas, sunbirds and some raptors
 Recent introductions: birds recently introduced by humans; some, such as the European goldfinch and greenfinch, appear to coexist with native fauna; others, such as the common starling, blackbird, house and tree sparrows, and the common myna, are more destructive
 Migratory shorebirds: a suite of waders in the Scolopacidae and Charadriidae families which breed in northern Asia and Alaska and spend the non-breeding season in Australasia
 Seabirds: a large and cosmopolitan group of petrels, albatrosses, sulids, gulls, terns and cormorants, many of which either breed on islands within Australian territory or frequent its coast and territorial waters

Regional lists
For comprehensive regional lists, see:
 List of birds of Australia, covering Australia and its territories
 List of birds of Australia, New Zealand and Antarctica, the HANZAB list for Australia, New Zealand, Antarctica and the surrounding ocean and subantarctic islands.

For Australia's endemic species, see:
 List of endemic birds of Australia

Other regional, state and island bird lists:
 Victoria
 New South Wales & Lord Howe Island
 Queensland
 Western Australia
 Tasmania
 Northern Territory
 South Australia
 Ashmore Reef
 Boigu, Saibai and Dauan Islands
 Christmas Island
 Cocos (Keeling) Islands
 Heard Island
 Kangaroo Island
 Macquarie Island
 Houtman Abrolhos

Organizations
National organizations
 BirdLife Australia (previously known as Birds Australia) is the leading Australian NGO for birds, birding,  ornithology and conservation, formed by a merger of the Royal Australasian Ornithologists Union and Bird Observation & Conservation Australia
 Australian Bird Study Association, for banders and other field ornithologists
 Birding-Aus - an Internet mailing list about Australian birds

Australian regional and state organisations
 Australian Capital Territory
 Birds Australia Southern NSW & ACT
 Canberra Ornithologists Group
 New South Wales
 NSW Bird Atlassers Inc.
 Birding NSW
 Birds Australia Northern NSW
 Birds Australia Southern NSW & ACT
 Cumberland Bird Observers Club
 Blue Mountains Bird Observers Inc.
 Queensland
 Birds Australia Capricornia
 Birds Australia North Queensland
 Birds Australia Southern Queensland
 Birds Queensland
 South Australia
 Birds SA
 Tasmania
 Birds Tasmania
 Victoria
 Birds Australia - Victoria
 Western Australia
 Birds Australia Western Australia

Regional references and guides
Important regional references include:
 Australia Birds, a portable folding guide authored by zoologist James Kavanagh, features 140 of the most familiar species. Part of a four title series on Australia flora & fauna featuring ecoregions and major bird spotting sites around the country.
 Finding Australian Birds, authored by Tim Dolby and Rohan Clarke (2014), features the best places in Australia for finding birds.
 The Handbook of Australian, New Zealand and Antarctic Birds (HANZAB), the pre-eminent scientific reference, in seven volumes.
 The New Atlas of Australian Birds, an extensive detailed survey of Australian bird distributions.
 The Action Plan for Australian Birds 2000, Garnett, Stephen T.; & Crowley, Gabriel M., Environment Australia, Canberra, 2000 , a comprehensive survey of the conservation status of Australian species, with costed conservation and recovery strategies.
 Reader's Digest Complete Book of Australian Birds was once the standard general reference, but is now somewhat dated. The second edition (1986) remains in print.
 Where to See Birds in Victoria, edited by Tim Dolby (2009), features places in Victoria for seeing birds.

Full-coverage field guides in print are as follows, in rough order of authority:
 Pizzey: Field Guide to the Birds of Australia, Pizzey, G, Knight, F and Menkhorst, P (ed), 7th edition, 2003 
 Slater: The Slater Field Guide to Australian Birds, Slater P, Slater P and Slater R, 2009 revised edition
 Simpson and Day: Field Guide to the Birds of Australia, Simpson K and Day N, 8th edition, 2010; 
 Morcombe: Field Guide to Australian Birds, Morcombe, M, 2nd edition 2003, and complete compact edition 2004
 Flegg: Photographic Field Guide: Birds of Australia, Flegg, J, 2nd edition, 2002
 Trounson: Australian Birds: A Concise Photographic Field Guide, Trounson D and Trounson M, 2005 reprint
 Cayley: What Bird is That?, Cayley, N, 2000 edition

Parasites
The country does not suffer from several Apicomplexan parasites found throughout the rest of the world. Several species of both avian haemoproteids and avian Plasmodium spp. are absent here.

References

External links 
 
 Australian raptors
 Fully digitised edition of The Birds of Australia in seven volumes by John Gould
 Action Plan for Australian Birds 2000 - PDF download
 
 Where to See Birds in Victoria edited by Tim Dolby
Yellow bellied sunbird video
Birds of Australia: treasures from the collection, State Library of Queensland